Ahmed Ismail Hussein Hudeidi, known as Hudeidi or Xudeydi, was a Somali musician who played the oud and composed songs.

Early life and career 
Hudeidi was born in Berbera in 1928 and raised in Yemen, where his father was a police sergeant. Hudeidi was always fascinated by music, and fell in love with the oud when his father took him to a party in Aden where an Arab man was playing the instrument. He learned  how to play it from Abdullahi Qarshe, who advised Hudeydi's father to buy his son an oud and a pick as well as books and writing instruments for school.

During the 1950s and 1960s, Hudeidi lived in Yemen, Somalia, and Djibouti, playing the oud and getting into trouble for singing politically rebellious songs as well as from rival musicians. In 1973 he moved to the United Kingdom, where he performed at private functions such as family weddings and taught others how to play the oud. 

He retired after a final concert at the Kayd Somali Arts and Culture centre in February 2020.

Death 
Hudeidi died on 8 April 2020 in London from COVID-19, eight days before his 92nd birthday.

See also 

 Music of Somalia

References 

Ethnic Somali people
1928 births
2020 deaths
Somalian emigrants to the United Kingdom
Somalian musicians
Deaths from the COVID-19 pandemic in England
Oud players
20th-century male musicians
21st-century male musicians